Reading Football Club played 2009–10 season in the Football League Championship, having lost 3–0 on aggregate to Burnley in the Championship playoff semi-final. Reading have a new manager, Brian McDermott, who succeeded ex-boss Brendan Rogers on 27 January 2010, after excelling in an FA Cup run as caretaker manager.

Review & events

Preseason – July
Reading travelled to Didcot Town for their first Pre-Season match where they ran out 5–1 winners with goals from Sigurdsson, Bignall, Henry, Harper and Church. Reading then lost 2–1 at Kettering Town with Church (11') scoring the only goal for the Berkshire side. Reading drew 2–2 with Premier League side, Chelsea in their final Pre-Season match, with goals from Jimmy Kebe and Scott Davies. However between the defeat to Kettering Town and draw with Chelsea Reading embarked on a tour of Sweden

Tour of Sweden
Reading beat Jonsereds 8–0 with Robson-Kanu scoring a hat trick, Church and Davies scoring braces and a goal from Gunnarsson. The Royals' next game was against Tolo IF whom they beat 4–0 with Shane Long scoring all four of Reading's goals. Reading played Qviding in their 3rd and final game of the tour, winning 2–1, with both goals scored by Noel Hunt after Reading were 1–0 down.

Reading XI, reserve and other matches
A Reading XI beat Tooting & Mitcham 3–0. Later on in the preseason campaign another Reading XI visited Farnborough where the Hampshire side were eventual 3–2 winners.
Reading also played a 'Champions XI' in a Testimonial match, for former player Graeme Murty, winning the match 3–2.

August
With the kick-off to the 2009–10 Championship season beginning on Saturday 8 August, Reading played Notts Forest and just like the season before, drew. Other fixtures in August were the heavy defeats to Newcastle and Sheffield United. However a draw away at Swansea and a convincing win at Barnsley were positives. Top scorer at the end of August is Noel Hunt

September
First match of the month saw Reading draw at home to Doncaster Rovers 0–0. The Royals then lost at home to Cardiff 1–0. The defeat was followed up by a loss to Peterborough. Despite the Royals being 2–0 up at half time, the lead was lost and Peterborough ended up winning 3–2. The month ended with further disappointment at the Madejski Stadium where, despite again taking the lead through an early goal from Grzegorz Rasiak, Reading could only draw 1–1 with Watford.

October
Leroy Lita returned to the Madejski Stadium on 2 October and scored the visitors second goal, as Middlesbrough won 2–0, extending Reading's winless run at home to 14 league games.

Squad

Left club during season

Transfers

In

Out

Loans in

Loans out

Released

Competitions

Championship

Results summary

Results by round

Results

League table

FA Cup

Notes
Jobi McAnuff was sent off for violent conduct after the final whistle.

Football League Cup

Player details

Appearances and goals

|-
|colspan="14"|Players who appeared for Reading but left during the season:

|}

Top scorers

Disciplinary record

Team kit
The 2009–10 Reading F.C. kits.

|
|
|
|}

References

Notes

2009-10 season
2009–10 Football League Championship by team